North Point Park is an  park located along the north side of the Charles River in Cambridge, Massachusetts and Boston's West End, created as mitigation for the taking of planned parkland for the construction of the Big Dig.

Description and history
The state-owned park opened in December 2007.  The municipal boundary between Cambridge and Boston was historically approximately along the center of Charles River, but construction of the park moved the shoreline, putting part of the park in Boston.

The park is part of the "lost half mile" of the Charles River, between the 1910 Charles River Dam, now the site of the Museum of Science, and the new Charles River Dam completed in 1978. The park opening was delayed for several years by a number of logistical and bureaucratic issues, but its design, including small islands, bridges and kayaking canals, has been characterized as "grand" and "ambitious" by the local press. The park was designed by Carr Lynch & Sandell of Cambridge and Oehme, van Sweden & Associates of Washington, DC. The park is adjacent to the ongoing NorthPoint real estate development project. Just upstream of the three new parks in the half-mile (North Point Park, Paul Revere Park, and Nashua Street Park) is the Paul Dudley White Bike Path in the Charles River Reservation. The Lynch Family Skatepark is located in North Point Park under the Interstate 93 highway ramps.

Pedestrian connections
Pedestrians and bicyclists may travel east from North Point Park to Paul Revere Park in Charlestown over the MBTA Commuter Rail tracks and the mouth of Miller's River via the North Bank Bridge that opened on July 13, 2012. This bridge, funded by the American Recovery and Reinvestment Act of 2009 (ARRA), allows pedestrians to traverse the north side of the Charles River basin. Pedestrian bridges are also planned over the Charles River from North Point Park to Nashua Street Park in Boston, and a South Bank Bridge over the MBTA Commuter Rail tracks on the south bank of the river from Nashua Street Park to the riverfront just upstream of the Zakim Bridge south tower, connecting the Charles River Reservation to Boston Harbor.

References

External links 

 

2007 establishments in Massachusetts
Geography of Cambridge, Massachusetts
Parks in Boston
Parks in Middlesex County, Massachusetts
Tourist attractions in Cambridge, Massachusetts
West End, Boston